Byun Sung-jin (born 10 November 1970) is a South Korean figure skater. She competed in the ladies' singles event at the 1988 Winter Olympics.

References

1970 births
Living people
South Korean female single skaters
Olympic figure skaters of South Korea
Figure skaters at the 1988 Winter Olympics
Place of birth missing (living people)